The Fillies' Revue Japanese フィリーズレビュー} is a Japanese Grade 2 flat horse race in Japan for three-year-old Thoroughbred fillies run over a distance of 1,400 metres at Hanshin Racecourse, Takarazuka, Hyogo. The race is run in March and serves as a major trial race for the Oka Sho. First three finished horses are provided to race at Oka Sho

It was first run in 1964. The race was run at Tokyo Racecourse in 1972. Among the winners of the race have been Meisho Mambo and the Oka Sho winners Hide Kotobuki, Tesco Gaby, Brocade, Mejiro Ramona, Kyoei March, Rhein Kraft.

Winners since 2000

Earlier winners

 1967 - Yama Pit
 1968 - Fine Rose
 1969 - Hide Kotobuki
 1970 - Tamami Karim
 1971 - Erimo Jenny
 1972 - Shimmoedake*
 1973 - Nitto Chidori
 1974 - Ebisu All
 1975 - Tesco Gaby
 1976 - Squash Tholon
 1977 - Daiwa Tesco
 1978 - San M Jo O
 1979 - Sea Bird Park
 1980 - Shadai Dancer
 1981 - Brocade
 1982 - Tsuki Marie
 1983 - Das Genie
 1984 - Dyna Sugar
 1985 - Erebus
 1986 - Mejiro Ramona
 1987 - Kosei
 1988 - Scarlet Ribbon
 1989 - Kokusai Liebe
 1990 - Eishin Sunny
 1991 - Isono Roubles
 1992 - Disco Hall
 1993 - Yamahisa Lauel
 1994 - Golden Jack
 1995 - Raiden Leader
 1996 - Little Audrey
 1997 - Kyoei March
 1998 - Max Can Do
 1999 - Fusaichi Airedale

See also
 Horse racing in Japan
 List of Japanese flat horse races

References

Turf races in Japan